Samasata–Amruka Branch Line was one of several branch lines in Pakistan, operated and maintained by Pakistan Railways. The line began at Samasata Junction and ended at Amruka. This Railway line was closed in 2011. However recently efforts are underway to reopen the line. The rail tracks are Samasatta-Amruka Section (total cost: PKR 7.735 billion),

Stations
 Samasata Junction
 Baghdad
 Abbasnagar
 Lal Suhanra
 Asrani
 Tamewali
 Sheikh Wahan
 Hasilpur
 Bakhshan Khan
 Chistian
 Chak Abdullah
 Madrisa
 Bahawalnagar Junction
 Mitti Roya
 Chabiana
 Minchinabad
 Chet Singhwala
 Mandi Sadiq Ganj Junction
 Sobha Wala
 Amruka

See also
 Karachi–Peshawar Railway Line
 Railway lines in Pakistan

References

Closed railway lines in Pakistan
Railway stations on Samasata–Amruka Branch Line
Railway lines opened in 1894
Railway lines closed in 2011
5 ft 6 in gauge railways in Pakistan